David Patrick Kelleher (born 24 May 1887) was an Irish Gaelic footballer, hurler, athlete and golfer. His championship career as a dual player with the Dublin senior teams spanned ten seasons from 1906 until 1915.

Kelleher made his debut on the inter-county scene as a member of the Dublin senior football team during the 1906 championship. Over the course of the next decade, he won three successive All-Ireland medals between 1906 and 1908 when he captained the team. He also won three Leinster medals. As a hurler, Kelleher was a one-time Leinster medal winner.

Honours
Dublin
All-Ireland Senior Football Championship (3): 1906, 1907, 1908 (c)
Leinster Senior Football Championship (3): 1906, 1907, 1908 (c)
Leinster Senior Hurling Championship (3): 1908

References

1887 births
1915 deaths
Dual players
Dublin inter-county Gaelic footballers
Dublin inter-county hurlers
Geraldines Gaelic footballers
Geraldines (Dublin) hurlers